Leticia Ocharán (1942–1997) was a Mexican artist and cofounder of several museums.

Education 
Ocharán studied art at the Escuela de Iniciación Artistica of the National Institute of Fine Arts under the tutoring of Salvador Bribiesca, Jesús Alvarez Amaya and José Marin Bosqued in Mexico City, and the Escuela de Artes Plásticas de Veracruz.

Work 
Ocharán's work was shown in over fifty solo exhibitions, and dozens of group shows internationally, including Mexico, Chilé, Puerto Rico, Argentina, Uruguay, Russia, the United States, Poland, Germany among others.

Ocharán co-founded several museums, including the Museum of Modern Art at Patzcuaro and the Museum of Modern Art of Morelia, both in the state of Michoacan, Mexico. She was known for her paintings and printmaking work, and she co-founded and was the maestra of printmaking at the Taller de Expresión Artistica.

She was also an activist for artist's rights, and campaigned for the copyrights of artists.

Collections 
Her work is held in numerous collections including the Museo de la Solidaaridad Salvador Allende, the Fondo Tabasco Collection, among others.

References

External links 
 Leticia Ocharán article on Spanish Wikipedia

20th-century Mexican women artists
1942 births
1997 deaths
Mexican muralists
20th-century Mexican painters
Mexican printmakers
20th-century printmakers
Mexican women painters
Women printmakers
Women muralists
People from Villahermosa
Artists from Tabasco
Museum founders
20th-century philanthropists